Kondut is a small town in Wheatbelt region of Western Australia.

The first European to visit and chart the area was the surveyor C Crossland in 1884. He named a nearby well Conduit Well.
The town was originally a railway siding that was constructed in 1913 as part of the Dowerin to Mullewa line.
The townsite was later gazetted in 1917.

The surrounding areas produce wheat and other cereal crops. The town is a receival site for Cooperative Bulk Handling.

References

External links 

Wheatbelt (Western Australia)
Grain receival points of Western Australia